Witchcraft is a studio album by American jazz guitarist John Abercrombie with Canadian bassist/pianist Don Thompson that was recorded in Toronto in 1986 and released by Justin Time in 1991.

Reception
Dan Cross of Allmusic stated:

Track listing

Personnel
John Abercrombie – guitar
Don Thompson – double bass, piano

References

John Abercrombie (guitarist) albums
1991 albums